Vincent George Kling (May 9, 1916 – November 23, 2013) was an American architect who co-founded the architectural practice KlingStubbins.

Biography 
Kling was born in East Orange, New Jersey on May 9, 1916. He was the son of a builder and joined his father's construction firm in high school. He earned his B.A. from Columbia University and M.Arch. from the Massachusetts Institute of Technology.

He enlisted in the United States Navy after the Japanese attack on Pearl Harbor and served in the Atlantic fleet's naval force until the end of war. He joined Skidmore, Owings & Merrill after the war and later set up his own practice, which became the largest architectural firm in Philadelphia. He was the principal architect and planner for Philadelphia's Penn Center.

Projects 

 Penn Center, Philadelphia
 Five Penn Center, Philadelphia
 Centre Square, Philadelphia
 Dilworth Park, Philadelphia
 Love Park, Philadelphia
 Annenberg Center for the Performing Arts
 Lankenau Medical Center
 Philadelphia Mint building
 AT&T Headquarters Basking Ridge, New Jersey (1971-1974)
 Concordia University Ann Arbor campus 
 Harriton High School campus

Awards 
Kling was awarded the Frank P. Brown Medal by the Franklin Institute in 1982. He was also the recipient of the Samuel F. B. Morse Medal from the National Academy of Design.

References 

1916 births
2013 deaths
Columbia College (New York) alumni
Massachusetts Institute of Technology alumni
Architects from Philadelphia
Skidmore, Owings & Merrill people